The 8th  Golden Globe Awards, honoring the best in film for 1950 films, were held on February 28, 1951, in the Ciro's nightclub in  West Hollywood, California, at 8433 Sunset Boulevard, on the Sunset Strip.

Winners and Nominees

Best Picture
 Sunset Boulevard
All About Eve
Born Yesterday
Cyrano de Bergerac
Harvey

Best Performance by an Actor in a Motion Picture  - Drama
  José Ferrer – Cyrano de Bergerac
Louis Calhern – The Magnificent Yankee
James Stewart – Harvey

Best Performance by an Actress in a Motion Picture - Drama 
 Gloria Swanson – Sunset Boulevard
Bette Davis – All About Eve
Judy Holliday – Born Yesterday

Best Performance by an Actor in a Motion Picture - Comedy or Musical
 Fred Astaire – Three Little Words
Dan Dailey – When Willie Comes Marching Home
Harold Lloyd – Mad Wednesday

Best Performance by an Actress in a Motion Picture - Comedy or Musical
 Judy Holliday – Born Yesterday
Spring Byington – Louisa
Betty Hutton – Annie Get Your Gun

Best Performance by an Actor in a Supporting Role in a Motion Picture
 Edmund Gwenn – Mister 880
George Sanders – All About Eve
Erich von Stroheim – Sunset Boulevard

Best Performance by an Actress in a Supporting Role in a Motion Picture
 Josephine Hull – Harvey
Judy Holliday – Adam's Rib
Thelma Ritter – All About Eve

Best Director - Motion Picture
 Billy Wilder – Sunset Boulevard
George Cukor – Born Yesterday
John Huston – The Asphalt Jungle
Joseph L. Mankiewicz – All About Eve

Best Screenplay - Motion Picture
 All About Eve – Joseph L. Mankiewicz
The Asphalt Jungle – John Huston
Sunset Boulevard – Charles Brackett

Best Music, Original Score - Motion Picture
 Sunset Boulevard – Franz Waxman
A Life of Her Own – Bronislau Kaper
Destination Moon – Leith Stevens

Cinematography - Black and White
 Cyrano de Bergerac – Franz F. Planer
The Asphalt Jungle
Sunset Boulevard

Cinematography - Color
 King Solomon's Mines – Robert Surtees
Broken Arrow
Samson and Delilah

New Star of the Year
 Gene Nelson
Mala Powers
Debbie Reynolds

Promoting International Understanding
 Broken Arrow directed by Delmer Daves
The Big Lift directed by George Seton
The Next Voice You Hear... directed by William A. Wellman

Henrietta Award (World Film Favorites)
 Gregory Peck and Jane Wyman

References

008
1950 film awards
1950 television awards
February 1951 events in the United States